Chinnachowk is a census town in Cuddapah district  in the state of Andhra Pradesh, India.

Demographics
 India census, Chinnachowk had a population of 64,053. Males constitute 51% of the population and females 49%. Chinnachowk has an average literacy rate of 71%, higher than the national average of 59.5%; with male literacy of 78% and female literacy of 64%. 11% of the population is under 6 years of age.

References

Villages in Kadapa district